The girls' mass start speed skating competition of the 2020 Winter Youth Olympics was held at Lake St. Moritz on 16 January 2020.

Results

Semifinals 
The first semifinal was held at 12:05, the second at 12:15.

Semifinal 1

Semifinal 2

Final 
The final was held at 13:10.

References 

 

Girls' mass start